Jun Pin Yuan is a 31-story,  tall twin residential skyscraper complex located in Sanchong District, New Taipei, Taiwan. The residential complex was completed in 2014 and provides 200 units of luxury apartments. Built under strict requirements of preventing damage caused by earthquakes and typhoons common on the island, facilities of the complex include banquet halls, conference rooms, a badminton court, fitness center, lounge bar and yoga classrooms. The complex is located in close proximity to Xianse Temple metro station.

See also 
 List of tallest buildings in New Taipei City
 Chicony Star Residential Building

References

2014 establishments in Taiwan
Residential skyscrapers in Taiwan
Skyscrapers in New Taipei
Apartment buildings in Taiwan
Residential buildings completed in 2014